Tula Pahate Re is an Indian Marathi romance-drama thriller television-series directed by Girish Mohite and Chandrakant Gaikwad and produced by Aparna Ketkar and Atul Ketkar which was distributed by Zee Entertainment Enterprises.

Plot

Past 
20 years ago, Gajendra Patil is shown as a poor orphan living with his roommate Vilas Zende in a Mumbai chawl. One day, as he is rushing to give an interview, he shares his Auto rickshaw with Rajnandini Saranjame, the middle-aged daughter of rich businessman Dadasaheb Saranjame and Snehalata Saranjame aka Aaisaheb who all live in a bungalow in Karjat, Maharashtra. As the tyre of Rajnandini's car gets punctured, Gajendra drops her to her destination only to realise that his interview is in the same company. Falling in love with her due to her richness, he fakes a fraud in his company and wins Rajnandini's trust. The two eventually confess their love for each other and get married. After their marriage, Gajendra begins to live in the Saranjame house with Rajnandini for Dadasaheb's wish. However, Dadasaheb gets all the proofs against him and insults him over obtaining his business. In retaliation, Gajendra unknowingly ends up making him have the wrong medicine, resulting in Dadasaheb's death. He also changes Dadasaheb's post-mortem reports which makes Aaisaheb think that she is responsible for Dadasaheb's death. Feeling guilty, she decides to reveal the truth to the police but Gajendra stops her, saying that she will have to go to jail if she does so. Days later, Rajnandini doubts Gajendra and fixes a microphone in his office-cabin. She catches Gajendra and Zende red-handed as their plan gets recorded in the microphone. Upon receiving this proof, Rajnandini threatens to hand over Gajendra and Zende to the police while Aaisaheb still does not know the truth. Feeling helpless, Gajendra unintentionally chokes her and pushes her off the balcony out of nowhere, resulting in Rajnandini's unfortunate death. He also renames himself as Vikrant Saranjame.

Present 
20 years later, Vikrant Saranjame is shown as a successful businessman of the company living with Aaisaheb and her younger son Jaydeep Saranjame in Karjat, Maharashtra. Vilas Zende is shown as his assistant in office. Soon, he somehow meets Isha Nimkar, a poor woman living in a chawl. He hires her as an employee in his company and falls in love with her. The two eventually confess their love for each other and get married after convincing Aaisaheb, Jaydeep, and others. After their marriage, Isha doubts Vikrant and tries to find out the truth. She manages to learn Vikrant's real-name from his old enemy Jalindar. Realising that she is fooled, a distressed Isha confronts Vikrant over his real identity at a restaurant and storms off. Vikrant narrates a fake story to her in order to regain her trust. He also takes her to a closed room in the Saranjame house where Rajnandini's and souvenirs are kept safely by him with Dadasaheb's photograph. However, Isha falls unconscious on seeing Rajnandini's photograph over there and her dream miraculously shows Rajnandini's life-events, including her murder committed by Vikrant. On seeing this dream, Isha also realises that she is indeed the "rebirth" of Rajnandini on remembering that she had found the old book titled Tula Pahate Re gifted to Rajnandini by Aaisaheb. Isha then sets out to seek revenge from Vikrant and Zende with Aaisaheb and Jaydeep's support. Zende doubts her and tried to reveal her plan to Vikrant who, however, refuses to believe him and secretly shoots him fatally. Finally, a brainwashed Vikrant confesses the truth to Isha in front of Aaisaheb, Jaydeep, and others. Vikrant then calls Isha to the balcony and confesses his love for her. However, he shockingly jumps off the balcony and commits suicide as he is unable to deal with his guilt, leaving Isha devastated. The serial ends with the real names of all the characters being shown to the audience.

Cast

Main 
 Subodh Bhave as Vikrant Saranjame / Gajendra Raghu Patil (Gaja)
 Gayatri Datar as Isha Arun Nimkar / Isha Vikrant Saranjame 
 Shilpa Tulaskar as Rajnandini Saranjame / Rajnandini Gajendra Patil

Supporting 
 Umesh Jagtap as Vilas Zende
 Abhidnya Bhave as Myra Karkhanis
 Anil Khopkar as Dadasaheb Saranjame
 Vidya Karanjikar as Snehalata Saranjame (Aaisaheb)
 Ashutosh Gokhale as Jaydeep Saranjame
 Malhar Bhave as young Jaydeep
 Purniema Dey-Demanna as Soniya Jaydeep Saranjame
 Mohiniraj Gatne as Arun Nimkar
 Gargi Phule-Thatte as Pushpa Arun Nimkar
 Sonal Pawar as Rupali
 Prathamesh Deshpande as Bipin Tillu
 Chitra Gadgil as Ranjana
 Ravindra Kulkarni as Mr. Tillu
 Ashok Sawant as Sarjerao 
 Leena Palekar as Manda
 Leena Padit as Mrs. Wadkar
 Sonali Khatavkar as Sapna
 Kedar Athawale as Mihir
 Satish Joshi as Mr. Paranjape
 Swanand Desai as F.M.
 Urmila Katkar as Jogtin
 Sandesh Jadhav as Jalindar
 Surabhi Bhave-Damle as Pinky
 Bhagyesh Patil as News Reporter

Reception

Special episode

2 hours 
 13 January 2019 (Vikrant-Isha's marriage)

Ratings

Awards

Adaptations

References

External links 
 
 Tula Pahate Re at ZEE5

Marathi-language television shows
2018 Indian television series debuts
Zee Marathi original programming
2019 Indian television series endings